Ebrahimabad (also Romanized as Ebrāhīmābād; also known as Abramabad, Ibrāhīmābād, and Ibrakhimabad) is a village in Bonab Rural District, in the Central District of Zanjan County, Zanjan Province, Iran. At the 2006 census, its population was 166, in 34 families.

References 

Populated places in Zanjan County